The Century Wrestling Alliance Television Championship is a secondary wrestling title in the Century Wrestling Alliance. It was first known by that name when the title was first established in 1994, and was renamed as the NWA New England Television Championship when the CWA joined the National Wrestling Alliance and became NWA New England in January 1998. The title returned to its original name when the CWA withdrew from the NWA on March 10, 2007.

Title history
Silver areas in the history indicate periods of unknown lineage.

References

External links
CWA/NWA New England TV title history

National Wrestling Alliance championships
Television wrestling championships
Regional professional wrestling championships